Iaazzanene (Tarifit: Iɛazanen, ⵉⵄⴰⵣⴰⵏⴻⵏ; Arabic: إعزانن) is a commune in the Nador Province of the Oriental administrative region of Morocco. At the time of the 2004 census, the commune had a total population of 11815 people living in 2305 households.

References

Populated places in Nador Province
Rural communes of Oriental (Morocco)